Aethes atlasi is a species of moth of the family Tortricidae. It was described by Razowski in 1962. It is found from Spain to Greece and in the southern Ural Mountains, Kazakhstan, Turkmenistan, Asia Minor, Iran, Lebanon and Morocco.

References

atlasi
Moths described in 1962
Moths of Asia
Moths of Europe
Moths of Africa
Taxa named by Józef Razowski